Onaga may refer to:

 Onaga (Mortal Kombat), a Mortal Kombat character
 Onaga, Kansas, a city in the United States
 Onaga, the Hawaiian language name for the fish  also known as ulaula koae or longtail red snapper
 Callistus Valentine Onaga (born 1958), Roman Catholic bishop
 Takeshi Onaga (1950–2018), Governor of Okinawa, Japan
 Hijiri Onaga (born 1995), Japanese football player
 Onaga Shale, a fossil-bearing geologic formation in Onaga, Nebraska

Japanese-language surnames
Okinawan surnames